Hank Dogs are an acoustic folk band from South London. The band members are Piano Pace, her ex-husband Andy Allan (formerly of Lightning Raiders and The Professionals), and his daughter Lily Ramona. Their music is considered to be in the English folk tradition. They started out in 1992 at an acoustic club in South London. In 1998 they traveled to Seattle with producer Jon Kertzer and played at the Bumbershoot Festival there.

Their first album Bareback, produced by Joe Boyd, was well received and was named Record of the Month for WXPN in Philadelphia.

Discography 
Albums
 Bareback (1999)
 Half Smile (2000)

Contributing artist
 The Rough Guide to English Roots Music (1998, World Music Network)

References

External links
 Hank Dogs on Myspace
 Hank Dogs on Allmusic

English folk musical groups
Musical groups from London
Musical groups established in 1992